Joseph Thomas Palastra Jr. (November 10, 1931 – March 3, 2015) was a United States Army four-star general who served as Commanding General, United States Army Forces Command from 1986 to 1989. During his tenure, in 1987, the title was changed to Commander in Chief, Forces Command. He was inducted into the Ranger Hall of Fame, class of 2010.

Military career
A native of New Hampshire, Palastra began his career as a second lieutenant after graduating from the United States Military Academy in 1954. Palastra also holds a Master of Business Administration from Auburn University. His military education includes the Infantry Officer Basic and Advanced Courses, the United States Army Command and General Staff College and the Air War College.

Palastra commanded I Corps and Fort Lewis, Washington. His other key assignments include Commanding General, 5th Infantry Division (Mechanized) and Fort Polk, Louisiana; Chief of Staff, Eighth United States Army/United States Forces Korea; and Deputy Commander in Chief/Chief of Staff, United States Pacific Command, Camp H.M. Smith, Hawaii.

In 1968 and 1969 Palastra served in Vietnam as Commander, B Company, 4th Aviation Battalion, and as Commander, 1st Battalion, 12th Infantry Regiment, in Vietnam's highlands. Palastra was a war-plans staff officer in the Office of the Deputy Chief of Staff for Military Operations, Washington, D.C., and, after attending the Air War College, returned to Washington to serve as a force structure analyst in the Office of the Chief of Staff.

Palastra has also commanded the 3rd Brigade of the 101st Airborne Division at Fort Campbell, Kentucky, and served as Deputy Director for Estimates in the Defense Intelligence Agency.

Awards and decorations

Palastra was married to the former Anne Rich. They have a son and four daughters. He died in 2015 in Highlandville, Missouri where he lived.

References

1931 births
2015 deaths
United States Army generals
United States Military Academy alumni
American Senior Army Aviators
Auburn University alumni
United States Army personnel of the Vietnam War
Recipients of the Distinguished Service Medal (US Army)
Recipients of the Silver Star
Recipients of the Legion of Merit
People from Portsmouth, New Hampshire
Recipients of the Air Medal
United States Army Command and General Staff College alumni
Recipients of the Defense Distinguished Service Medal
People from Kittery, Maine
People from Christian County, Missouri
Air War College alumni